Devi is a 1960 Bengali-language Hindu drama film by director Satyajit Ray, starring debutante Sharmila Tagore and Soumitra Chatterjee. It is based on a short story by Provatkumar Mukhopadhyay. The film is based on the worship of women and young girls as incarnations of the goddesses Durga or Kali, which is more prevalent in Nepal as the Kumari tradition.

Plot
The film begins with the making of an idol of Durga, the prevalent goddess of Bengal, and its worship during the Durga Puja festival.

In 19th-century rural Bengal, Doyamoyee (Sharmila Tagore) and her husband Umaprasad (Soumitra Chatterjee) live with Umaprasad's family. Umaprasad's elder brother Taraprasad, his wife and their young son Khoka (with whom Doyamoyee shares a special bond) also live in this house. Umaprasad and Taraprasad's father, Kalikinkar Choudhuri, is a devotee of the goddess Kali.

Umaprasad leaves for Kolkata (Calcutta) to teach in college and learn English, and Doyamoyee remains behind to take care of her father-in-law. One evening, Kalikinkar has a vivid dream that intermingles the eyes of Kali and that of Doyamoyee. When Kalikinkar awakens, he is convinced that Doyamoyee is an incarnation of Kali. He goes to Doyamoyee and worships at her feet. Following Kalikainker's gesture, Taraprasad also accepts Doyamoyee as an incarnation of the goddess. But Taraprasad's wife believes the entire idea is ridiculous and writes a letter to Umaprasad urging him to return home as soon as possible. Soon Kalikinker starts to worship Doyamoyee officially and changes her room and lifestyle. Many people start to visit her and offer prayers and drink the charanamrito (water with which the goddess's foot has been washed). Then a man comes with his terminally ill grandson, and after drinking the charanamrito, the boy wakes up. This coincidence leads other people to believe that she is an incarnation of the goddess. Umaprasad returns home at this point and is horrified by what he sees and yet is unable to counter his father's assertions about Doyamoyee being the Goddess herself due to this recent 'miracle'.

Umaprasad sneaks into Doyamoyee's room and convinces her to escape with him to Calcutta. Once they reach the riverbank from where they were supposed to take a boat, Doyamoyee refuses for she is scared and starts doubting that if she were indeed the Goddess, it might harm Umaprasad if she defies the family's wishes and elopes. Umaprasad returns her to her room and eventually goes away to Calcutta again. Over time Doyamoyee, only seventeen is stifled by the loneliness that is forced upon her. Khoka also avoids her even though he used to spend most of his time with her before. She is compelled to a life of isolation and myth, far away from a life of reality. This saddens her deeply, but she is unable to escape as she is bound to superstitions and a patriarchal society.

Meanwhile, Khoka has developed a severe fever. The family refuses to go to a doctor, believing that Doyamoyee's charanamrito will heal Khoka. So, they keep the child near Doyamoyee that night. But being a logical person, Khoka's mother asks Doyamoyee to give up and tell their father-in-law to visit the doctor. But as a young girl of seventeen, Doyamoyee is unable to voice it out and instead decides to keep Khokha with her that night because she misses his company while hoping he recovers miraculously.

The next morning, when Umaprasad returns home to take action against his father's beliefs and to free Doyamoyee from this situation, he finds his father crying at the feet of goddess Kali's idol. The reason is at that morning, Khoka died due to lack of proper treatment; the Charanamrito didn't work and the belief cost the child's life. Umaprasad rushes to Doyamoyee's room and finds her in an abnormal condition, as she mumbles that she should go to the water (visarjan), otherwise the family would kill her. Umaprasad is unable to make her see sense, as Khoka's death and her own experiences of being called a goddess become too much for her to bear, breaking her psychologically.

Cast
 Sharmila Tagore - Dayamoyee
 Chhabi Biswas - Kalikinkar Choudhuri
 Soumitra Chatterjee - Umaprasad
 Purnendu Mukherjee - Taraprasad
 Karuna Banerjee - Harasundari
 Arpan Chowdhury - Khoka, child
 Anil Chatterjee - Bhudeb
 Kali Sarkar - Professor Sarkar
 Mohammed Israil - Nibaran
 Khagesh Chakravarti - Kaviraj
 Nagendranath Kabyabyakarantirtha - Priest
 Santa Devi - Sarala

Preservation
The Academy Film Archive preserved Devi in 1996.

Critical reception and legacy
The film received critical acclaim upon its release. On Rotten Tomatoes, Devi holds a score of 100% based on 10 reviews for an average rating of 7.6/10. Directors William Wyler and Elia Kazan have described the film as "poetry on celluloid". The director Francis Ford Coppola considers Devi to be Ray's best work and called it "a cinematic milestone".

The film was adapted into an opera, The Goddess, by Allen Shearer.

Awards
National Film Awards
 1960: President's silver medal for Best Feature Film in Bengali

Cannes Film Festival
 1962: Palme d'Or (Golden Palm) - Nominated

Other credits
 Art direction: Bansi Chandragupta
 Sound designer: Durgadas Mitra

References

External links
 
 satyajitray.org

1960 films
1960 drama films
Bengali-language Indian films
Indian drama films
Indian black-and-white films
Films about Hinduism
Films about women in India
Films set in the 19th century
Films directed by Satyajit Ray
Films with screenplays by Satyajit Ray
Best Bengali Feature Film National Film Award winners
1960s Bengali-language films
Films adapted into operas